The Sejong National Research Complex is a campus of four research buildings housing ten research institutes. Institutes started to relocate to the complex in 2014. It neighbors the Korea Institute of Public Finance , Korea Legislation Research Institute, and the Korea Research Institute for Human Settlements and is approximately 1.6 kilometers away from the Korea Development Institute.

Research Institutes
The research complex is divided into four primary buildings, A, B, C, and D divided by research topics.

A - Research Support
National Research Council for Economics, Humanities and Social Sciences (NRC)
Science and Technology Policy Institute (STEPI) (part of 3rd floor)
National Research Council of Science and Technology (NST)

B - Science and Infrastructure
Korea Transport Institute (KOTI)
Science and Technology Policy Institute (STEPI)
Korea Environment Institute (KEI)

C - Economic Policy
Korea Institute for International Economic Policy (KIEP)
Korea Labor Institute (KLI)
Korea Institute for Industrial Economics and Trade (KIET)

D - Social Policy
Korea Institute for Health and Social Affairs (KIHASA)
National Youth Policy Institute (NYPI)
Korea Research Institute for Vocational Education and Training (KRIVET)

References

Government agencies of South Korea
Research institutes in South Korea
Sejong City